Stadionul Victoria Someșeni, also known as Baza Sportivă Ardealul, is a multi-use stadium in Cluj-Napoca, Romania. It is used mostly for football matches and is the home ground of CFR II Cluj. The stadium holds 1,300 people (1,000 on the main stand and 300 on the stand of the artificial turf). It was renovated in 2009, when was also expanded with the 300 people stand and the artificial turf.

References

External links
 Stadionul Victoria Someșeni at Soccerway
 Teren Sintetic Victoria Someșeni at Soccerway

Football venues in Romania
Buildings and structures in Cluj-Napoca
Sport in Cluj-Napoca